The Arnhem leaf-nosed bat (Hipposideros inornatus) is a species of bat in the family Hipposideridae. It lives in the sandstone areas of Kakadu National Park (Northern Territory, Australia).

Taxonomy and etymology
It was described as a subspecies of the diadem leaf-nosed bat in 1970, with the trinomen of Hipposideros diadema inornatus. Its taxonomic status has fluctuated several times since its initial description as a subspecies. Since 1970, it has been fully synonymized with the diadem leaf-nosed bat, recognized again as a subspecies, affirmed as a full species, demoted again to subspecies, and elevated once again to full species. Its species name "inornatus" is Latin for "unadorned."

Biology and ecology
It is nocturnal, foraging at night and roosting in sheltered places during the day such as caves or old mines. It is insectivorous, feeding on beetles, moths, cockroaches, and leafhoppers.

Range and habitat
It is endemic to the Northern Territory of Australia. Recent records of it have all been within Kakadu National Park.

Conservation
As of 2020, it is considered a vulnerable species by the IUCN. It meets the criteria for this classification because it is estimated that there are fewer than 1,000 mature individuals left. However, the species does occur within a protected area and its population trend is believed to be stable. In Australia, it is federally listed as "endangered" under the EPBC Act. Locally, it is listed as "vulnerable" in the Northern Territory under the Territory Parks and Wildlife Conservation Act 2000.

References

Hipposideros
Bats of Australia
Mammals of the Northern Territory
Kakadu National Park
Endemic fauna of Australia
Mammals described in 1970
EPBC Act endangered biota